United States gubernatorial elections were held on 5 November 1968, in 21 states and one territory, concurrent with the House, Senate elections and presidential election. These were the last gubernatorial elections for Arizona, New Mexico, and Wisconsin to take place in a presidential election year, as all would extend their governors' terms from two to four years.

Arizona 
Jack Richard Williams won re-election against Samuel Pearson Goddard Jr., in a "rematch" election, in which Goddard was trying to get his old job back. This was basically a repeat of the 1966 Arizona governor's race, with Williams winning.

Arkansas 
Winthrop Rockefeller had already made his mark in 1966, when he was elected as the first Republican governor since 1872 and having the black vote to boot, not to mention challenging the Faubus empire two years before in 1964. Getting re-elected in 1968 was good, but things for Rockefeller went downhill from there.

Delaware 
Terry not wanting to take the National Guard out of the black communities in Wilmington played a factor in his defeat, not to mention that Peterson had made it. Peterson would go on to be a legend in Delaware politics in a short time, mainly for his "green" politics.

Illinois 
Samuel H. Shapiro was governor temporarily after Otto Kerner Jr. resigned in order to accept appointment to the federal appellate court. Shapiro lost the race to get his own full term. Kerner, would become famous for two things: being the head of the National Advisory Commission on Civil Disorders, aka the Kerner Commission, and going to jail over various charges stemming from being a stockholder in a racetrack business.

Indiana 
Indiana changed its laws so that governors could have two back-to-back four-year terms beginning in November 1972. Thus, Branigin
was not eligible for a second term.

Iowa 
Harold Hughes resigned on January 1, 1969, to run for United States Senate. Robert D. Fulton would serve as governor from January 1 to January 16, 1969, when the new Governor, Robert D. Ray took office. Ray would go on to a political career, while Hughes, inspired by his own battles with alcoholism, made drug/alcohol abuse his focus in the Senate, and later left politics to open an alcoholism treatment center and to do religious work.

Kansas 
George Docking won re-election. Ultimately, he would set a record by winning four two-year terms.  Kansas governors served two-year terms until 1974, when a constitutional amendment was added, creating a four-year term system.

Missouri 
In Missouri, during Warren Hearnes' term, the laws were changed so that governors were allowed two back-to-back four-year terms. Thus, by 1968, Hearnes was eligible for another term.

Montana 
Tim Babcock became governor in January 1962 after his predecessor, Governor Donald Nutter, was killed in a plane crash.  Babcock won a full term in the 1964 gubernatorial election.

New Hampshire 
King might have run for another term had the 1968 presidential election not gotten in his way. He was an
avid President Lyndon B. Johnson supporter, and a "hawk" on Vietnam.  So, when Senator Eugene McCarthy dropped into New Hampshire, King didn't hold back, but his attacks didn't work. President Johnson dropped out of the presidential race, and Vice President Hubert Humphrey joined the race as a result and asked King to run for the Senate. King did, but lost to Republican Norris Cotton.

New Mexico 
David Cargo was re-elected in 1968. Being term-limited in 1970 (see 1970 United States gubernatorial elections), he tried running for other offices, but "Lonesome Dave" never won again.

North Carolina 
In North Carolina, governors were not allowed two consecutive terms until 1977.

North Dakota 
Governors served two-year terms until 1964, when a constitutional amendment changed it to a four-year term.

West Virginia 
In 1970, during Arch Moore’s term, an amendment to the West Virginia constitution allowed governors to serve two consecutive terms. Thus, Hulett Smith was not eligible for a second term.

Races

See also 
1968 United States elections
1968 United States presidential election
1968 United States Senate elections
1968 United States House of Representatives elections

References 

 
November 1968 events in the United States